Bima Regency is a regency of the Indonesian Province of West Nusa Tenggara. It is located on the island of Sumbawa and the capital is Woha. The Regency covers an area of 4,389.40 km2, and had a population of 438,522 at the 2010 Census and 514,105 at the 2020 Census; the official estimate as at mid 2021 was 520,444. It administratively excludes but geographically completely surrounds Bima City on the landward side.

It has two non-contiguous parts, which are separated by the northeastern coastal portion of Dompu Regency.  The larger eastern half of Bima Regency covers the easternmost quarter of the island (excluding Bima City), and comprises sixteen districts. The smaller western part of Bima Regency covers the northern half of the Sanggar Peninsula, which is dominated by Mount Tambora, and comprises Sanggar District and Tambora District; to the north-east of this part is Sanggar Bay. Three bodies of water border the regency - Bima Bay, Waworada Bay, and Sape Strait.

The Regency is nearly co-terminus with the former Sultanate of Bima and includes the nearby islands of Sangeang, Banta, and Managate. The island of Kambing, which lies in Bima Bay, is also part of the Regency.

Administrative Districts 
Bima Regency consists of eighteen districts (kecamatan), tabulated below with their areas and their populations at the 2010 Census and the 2020 Census, together with the official estimates as at mid 2021. The table also includes the locations of the district administrative centres, the number of administrative villages (rural desa and urban kelurahan) and the number of offshore islands in each district, and its postal codes.

Sister District
 Kulim, Malaysia

References

External links 

 

Regencies of West Nusa Tenggara